Marina Puerto Salina is a marina in the Mexican state of Baja California. It is located at 73 km south of Tijuana at 32° 3.28´N 116° 53.20´W.  Puerto Salina is the first marina in Mexico south of the United States border on the Pacific Ocean. Puerto Salina is located next to La Salina, Baja California, 62 km (45 mi) south of San Diego Bay.  The marina has more than 250 slips and can accommodate yachts as large as 100 feet in length.

Gallery

External links 
 Puerto Salina
 Marina Puerto Salina
 La Salina Beach Hotel

Populated places in Baja California
Port cities and towns on the Mexican Pacific coast
Ensenada, Baja California
Ports and harbors of Baja California
Buildings and structures in Baja California
Seaside resorts in Baja California
Beaches of Baja California